Major General Ronald Ramsay McNicoll,  (15 September 1906 – 18 September 1996) was an Australian Army general who served in the Royal Australian Engineers.

Early life
Born on 15 September 1906 in Melbourne, Victoria, McNicoll was the son of Sir Walter McNicoll and elder brother of Sir Alan McNicoll. Growing up in Goulburn, he completed his schooling at Scots College before taking up an appointment as a staff cadet at the Royal Military College, Duntroon in 1923. After graduating from Duntroon in 1926, he was granted the rank of lieutenant in the engineers and undertook a civilian engineering degree at the University of Sydney.

Military career
In the pre-war years, he was involved in constructing bases in the northern part of Australia, including Larrakeyah Barracks in Darwin. He was also posted to the 4th Division in Melbourne, undertook training overseas and served in regimental appointments in Brisbane, Adelaide  and then later Keswick, in South Australia.

During the Second World War, McNicoll saw active service in the Middle East and in Europe, including a period on exchange with the Supreme Headquarters Allied Expeditionary Force, helping to plan the D-Day landings. He was Mentioned in Despatches as a major of engineers while serving in the 6th Division.

After the war, he was steadily promoted. As a temporary brigadier he briefly served during the Korean War deploying with the Australian Ancillary Unit in March 1953.  He undertook a number of different staff appointments including Chief Engineer of Eastern Command and Engineer-in-Chief, Army Headquarters. He eventually reaching the rank of major general before retiring from the military in 1964. He later wrote three volumes of the Royal Australian Engineers corps history, covering the periods from colonial Australia to the Second World War. He was appointed a Commander of the Order of the British Empire in 1957, and a Member of the Order of Australia in 1982. He died on 18 September 1996.

Notes
Citations

Bibliography

Further reading
 

1906 births
1996 deaths
Australian generals
Australian military historians
Australian military personnel of the Korean War
Australian military personnel of World War II
Commanders of the Order of the British Empire
Members of the Order of Australia
Military personnel from Melbourne
People educated at Scots College (Sydney)
Royal Military College, Duntroon graduates
Australian military engineers
Australian people of Norwegian descent
People from Goulburn